Dan Gooley is an American college baseball coach, formerly the head coach of Quinnipiac (1977–1987, 2002–2014) and Hartford (1988–1992). Gooley retired following the 2014 season.

Gooley played baseball at Quinnipiac and served as an assistant coach at Quinnipiac from 1971 to 1976.  Prior to the start of the 1977 season, Gooley was named Quinnipiac's head coach. Quinnipiac, then a Division II program, reached three NCAA Division II Tournaments and one Division II College World Series under Gooley. In the summer of 1977, he skippered the Falmouth Commodores of the Cape Cod Baseball League.

Gooley left Quinnipiac following the 1987 season to serve as the head coach at Division I Hartford. In five seasons as Hartford's head coach, he had a record of 101-90-1.  After spending several years as a business executive and Quinnipiac administrator, Gooley again became the head coach of Quinnipiac (which had since become a Division I member) for the 2002 season. In 2005, Gooley led the Bobcats to their only NCAA tournament appearance.

Head coaching record
The following is a table of Gooley's yearly records as an NCAA head baseball coach.

References

Living people
Year of birth missing (living people)
Hartford Hawks baseball coaches
Quinnipiac Bobcats baseball coaches
Quinnipiac Bobcats baseball players
Cape Cod Baseball League coaches
Southern Connecticut State University alumni